The Invitation Tour was a tour by rapper 50 Cent in support of his latest/upcoming studio albums, Before I Self Destruct, Black Magic (which was subsequently shelved), and his fifth studio album. The tour also featured G-Unit artists Tony Yayo, Lloyd Banks, 40 Glocc, Spider Loc, Trav, and Governor. Other artists featured on the tour include Jay Electronica, Jay Rock, and Lil B, and professional boxer Floyd Mayweather along with Brazilian football star Ronaldinho. Appearances by several additional artists have occurred, including Ludacris and E-40.

Background
50 Cent stated that G-Unit will not tour with him due to Lloyd Banks the rising success of his first single from his new album and Tony Yayo completing his next album. 50 has said that he will be performing songs from his fourth studio album, Before I Self Destruct, and his uptempo fifth studio album, Black Magic. 50 announced that he would be recruiting new artists to sign to his label, who would also tour with him. He has confirmed that R&B artist, Governor would be featured in the tour. Recently, New Orleans artist, Jay Electronica, confirmed that he too would be featured in the tour. Ludacris has joined on to perform at Chene Park in Detroit on May 29, 2010.

Locations
The tour's itinerary included the following 17 cities. Originally 19 cities were announced, but the shows in Cleveland on May 28, Dallas on June 11, Atlanta on June 17, Raleigh on June 19, and New York on June 22 were all canceled. However, 3 shows (Ventura, St. Petersburg, and Lewiston) were added, with late addition Lewiston having a notably smaller population than the rest of the tour locations.

References

2010 concert tours